Cyperus brumadoi is a species of sedge that is native to parts of Brazil.

See also 
 List of Cyperus species

References 

brumadoi
Plants described in 1993
Flora of Brazil